The 1920 Buffalo Bisons football team represented the University of Buffalo as an independent during the 1920 college football season. Led by Art Powell in his fifth season as head coach, the team compiled a record of 1–4.

Schedule

References

Buffalo
Buffalo Bulls football seasons
Buffalo Bisons football